Run to the Light is the third studio album by American doom metal band Trouble, released by Metal Blade Records on July 15, 1987, being the band's last release on that label. It was the band's first album to have Ron Holzner on bass guitar and the only Trouble album with Dennis Lesh on drums. A music video was made for the title track.

Track listing

Personnel

Trouble
Eric Wagner – vocals
Bruce Franklin – guitars
Rick Wartell – guitars
Ron Holzner – bass
Dennis Lesh – drums

Additional musicians
Daniel Long – keyboards
Jeff Olson – Hammond organ in the song "The Beginning"

Production
Jim Faraci, Trouble – producer
Ian Burgess – engineer
Scott Hull – painting
Jack Koshick – management
John Jezak – photography
Eddie Schreyer – mastering at Capitol Records in Hollywood, California

References

Trouble (band) albums
1987 albums
Metal Blade Records albums
Enigma Records albums